Medicago monspeliaca, the hairy medick, is a species of annual herb in the family Fabaceae. They have a self-supporting growth form and compound, broad leaves. Individuals can grow to 0.12 m.

Sources

References 

monspeliaca
Flora of Malta